Międzyrzecz-Wybudowanie  is a village in the administrative district of Gmina Międzyrzecz, within Międzyrzecz County, Lubusz Voivodeship, in western Poland.

The village has a population of 79 (population in 2008).

References

Villages in Międzyrzecz County